The Order of Petar Zrinski and Fran Krsto Frankopan is the 11th most important medal given by the Republic of Croatia. The order was founded on 1 April 1995. The medal is awarded with two versions of the Croatian interlace: the golden one posthumously for valor in combat, and the silver one for persons declared missing in the Croatian War of Independence. It is named after Petar Zrinski and Fran Krsto Frankopan.

References 

Orders, decorations, and medals of Croatia
Awards established in 1995
1995 establishments in Croatia